Cheltenham by-election may refer to one of three 20th-century by-elections held for the British House of Commons constituency of Cheltenham in Gloucestershire:

 1911 Cheltenham by-election
 1928 Cheltenham by-election
 1937 Cheltenham by-election

See also 
 Cheltenham constituency
 Cheltenham
 List of United Kingdom by-elections
 United Kingdom by-election records